Charles Wieand, also known as Wild Charles, is a comedian, daredevil, adventurer, travel host and YouTube personality. He also hosts a show on Facebook Watch. Wieand is known for his animal & nature videos, such as swimming with alligators, swimming with an anaconda, and beekeeping without clothing. Wieand's show has featured John Godwin, Chris Jericho and Jake Paul. Wieand also performs stand-up comedy.

References 

American male comedians
21st-century American comedians
Living people
Year of birth missing (living people)
Place of birth missing (living people)
American stand-up comedians